Jurruru may refer to:
Jurruru people, an indigenous Australian people
Jurruru language, an extinct Australian Aboriginal language

See also
Jururu language (Brazil), an unclassified language of Brazil